Pharmacokinetics simulation is a simulation method used in determining the safety levels of a drug during its development.

Purpose
Pharmacokinetics simulation gives an insight to drug efficacy and safety before exposure of individuals to the new drug that might help to improve the design of a clinical trial. 
Pharmacokinetics simulations help in addition in therapy planning, to stay within the therapeutic range under various physiological and pathophysiological conditions, e.g., chronic kidney disease.

Simulators
Simcyp Simulator and GastroPlus (from Simulations Plus) are  simulators that take account for individual variabilities.
PharmaCalc v02 and PharmaCalcCL allow to simulate individual plasma-concentration time curves based on (published) pharmacokinetic parameters such as half-life, volume of distribution etc.

Simulation
Computational chemistry